Ladies' Turn is a 2012 documentary film directed by Hélène Harder.

Synopsis 
Featuring members of the Ladies' Turn association as well as local female football (soccer) players, the film chronicles a battle led by Senegalese girls to break taboos around girls playing football.

Awards and accolades 

 Best Feature Film, 2012 London Feminist Film Festival 
 Feminist Favourite audience award, 2012 London Feminist Film Festival

External links

References 

2012 films
Russian documentary films